Sharajabad (also Romanized as Sharajābād, Sharaj Abad, Sharjābād, and Sherajābād; also known as Shāhrajua, Shāhrajūyeh, Sharadzhua, and Shīrajābād) is a village in Zarjabad Rural District, Firuz District, Kowsar County, Ardabil Province, Iran. At the 2006 census, its population was 48, in 13 families.

References 

Tageo

Towns and villages in Kowsar County